A shock stall is a stall created when the airflow over an aircraft's wings is disturbed by shock waves formed when flying at or above the aircraft's drag divergence Mach number.

A stall is the decrease in lift to a value below the Weight, and the associated increase in drag upon the separation of the boundary layer (in this case behind the shock wave).

Aerodynamics